The International Journal of Language & Communication Disorders is a peer-reviewed medical journal that covers topics relevant to speech and language disorders and speech and language therapy. Article types published are research reports, reviews, discussions, and clinical fora. It is the official journal of the Royal College of Speech and Language Therapists. The journal is published by Wiley-Blackwell and edited by Dr Steven Bloch and Dr Cristina McKean. The journal was established in 1966 and has a 2018 impact factor of 1.504. The journal is available online and is published 6 times a year.

The movie The King's Speech has caused much awareness about stuttering. In response to this, a virtual issue of the journal was produced on the theme of The King's Speech and stuttering research.

References

External links 
 

English-language journals
Audiology journals
Wiley-Blackwell academic journals
Bimonthly journals
Publications established in 1966
Communication journals
Academic journals associated with learned and professional societies of the United Kingdom